NGC 7070A is a face-on lenticular galaxy located about 100 million light-years away in the constellation of Grus.

Physical characteristics 
It has dust lanes which cross it and incomplete shells surrounding it. Also, there are faint luminous tails extending from the galaxy towards NGC 7070. It is theorized that these features may have formed due to the accretion of a smaller disk galaxy about a billion years ago which got disrupted by NGC 7070A.

Nearby galaxies
NGC 7070A is member of a group of galaxies known as the NGC 7079 Group.

Active galactic nucleus
XMM-Newton observations of NGC 7070A show that the galaxy hosts moderate AGN activity.

See also 
 List of NGC objects (7001–7840)
 Centaurus A 
 NGC 1316

References

External links 

Lenticular galaxies
Active galaxies
Peculiar galaxies
Grus (constellation)
7070A
66909
NGC 7079 Group